Dr.Raj Kumar Chabbewal is an Indian politician and member of Indian National Congress. He is currently serving as a member of the Punjab Legislative Assembly from Chabbewal.

Political career 
Chabbewal joined the Indian National Congress in 2009. He was first elected to the Punjab Legislative Assembly from Chabbewal in 2017. In 2022, he was re-elected from the same constituency. On 10 April 2022 he was made the deputy CLP leader of the Punjab Legislative Assembly. Chabbewal was appointed the Chairperson of Congress's Scheduled Caste (SC) Department, Punjab in 2015. He is also a member of All India Congress Committee.

MLA
He was elected as MLA in 2022. The Aam Aadmi Party gained a strong 79% majority in the sixteenth Punjab Legislative Assembly by winning 92 out of 117 seats in the 2022 Punjab Legislative Assembly election. MP Bhagwant Mann was sworn in as Chief Minister on 16 March 2022.

Electoral performance

References

External links 
 

Living people
1969 births
Indian National Congress politicians
Punjab, India MLAs 2017–2022
Punjab, India MLAs 2022–2027